Michael Anthony Howard (born 2 December 1978) is an English footballer who plays as a defender who plays for Afan Lido.

Career

Born in Birkenhead, Merseyside, Howard initially started his career with Liverpool before being signed as a trainee by Tranmere Rovers. He was signed by Jim Harvey for Morecambe from Swansea City, where he had been a regular for 6 seasons, at the start of the 2004–05 season.

His consistent performances at left-back saw him win the 'Junior Red of the Year' award at the award ceremony at the end of the 2005–06 season. This award was voted for by members of the Morecambe Junior Reds Supporters' Club.

In January 2008, Howard joined Oxford United on a short-term loan deal. He was released by Morecambe in May 2009 and subsequently joined Welsh Premier side Llanelli, making his debut in the Europa League victory against Motherwell. In July 2010, Howard joined Aberystwyth Town.

In June 2012 he joined  Afan Lido.

References

External links

1978 births
Sportspeople from Birkenhead
Living people
Association football defenders
English footballers
Liverpool F.C. players
Tranmere Rovers F.C. players
Swansea City A.F.C. players
Morecambe F.C. players
Oxford United F.C. players
Llanelli Town A.F.C. players
Aberystwyth Town F.C. players
English Football League players
National League (English football) players
Cymru Premier players
Afan Lido F.C. players
Footballers from Merseyside